Nuthin' 2 Prove is the third studio album by American rapper Lil Yachty. It was released on October 19, 2018, by Capitol Records, Motown and Quality Control Music. The album features guest appearances from Playboi Carti, Juice Wrld, Lil Baby, Young Nudy, Cardi B, Offset, Trippie Redd, Kevin Gates, and Gunna.

Background
Lil Yachty revealed the cover art on October 11, 2018, to Billboard. He confirmed the release date and album name via his Twitter account in September.

Promotion
"Who Want the Smoke?" featuring Cardi B and Offset, was released as the album's lead single on July 6, 2018. The song was produced by Tay Keith.

Critical reception

Nuthin' 2 Prove was met with mixed reviews. At Metacritic, which assigns a normalized rating out of 100 to reviews from professional publications, the album received an average score of 52, based on eight reviews.

Trey Alston of Pitchfork gave a positive review, stating "When he bellows and trills, regardless of what's actually coming out of his mouth, the results are leagues better than when he tries to do his best rapper impression on songs". In a mixed review, XXLs Charles Holmes stated: "Nuthin' 2 Prove, like its 2018 predecessor, Lil Boat 2, largely sees Yachty spinning in place, warring with his past and grasping at a murky future." Sam Moore of NME said, "With a swelling back catalogue, it's becoming increasingly clear what does and doesn't work for Yachty's solo output: skippable braggadocious freestyles? No. Endearing and experimental takes on hip-hop that demonstrate his more individualistic approach to being a major rap artist? Yes please". Kenan Draughorne of HipHopDX said, "By Quality Control's standards, Nuthin' 2 Prove is a brisk listen-through as it clocks in at just over 45 minutes, but it certainly feels as bloated as recent projects from Migos and Quavo's solo album".

Andy Kellman of AllMusic saying "Only with "Who Want the Smoke?" does the first half rise above the preceding album, yet Yachty's the third wheel, eclipsed by verses from Cardi B and Offset. He's more at ease on the lightheaded "melodic" tracks of the latter half, back to goofy-vulgar observations, musical crib-mobile melodies, and occasional openhearted moments that sound natural rather than forced". In a negative review, Exclaim!s Clayton Tomlinson stated: "Lil Yachty's Nuthin' 2 Prove serves more to show off the talents of the featured artists than anything else. None of the Atlanta artist we know and used to love is present on this joint."

Track listing

Notes
 "Who Want the Smoke?" features additional vocals from BlocBoy JB

Sample credits
 "Gimmie My Respect" contains elements from "Killa", performed by Kingpin Skinny Pimp, Lil Sko and Lil Gin.
 "Forever World" contains elements from "Soon as I Get Home", written by Sean Combs, Carl Thompson, Faith Evans and Kervin Cotten, performed by Faith Evans.

Personnel
Credits adapted from the album's liner notes and Tidal.

 Thomas "Tillie" Mann – mixing (all tracks)
 Stephen "DotCom" Farrow – mixing assistant (tracks 1–7, 9–15)
 Colin Leonard – mastering (all tracks)
 Gentuar Memishi – engineering (track 1)

Charts

Release history

References

2018 albums
Albums produced by Cubeatz
Albums produced by Tay Keith
Capitol Records albums
Lil Yachty albums
Motown albums
Quality Control Music albums
Hip hop albums by American artists
Trap music albums
Pop albums by American artists